is the twenty-fourth single by B'z, released on April 8, 1998. The song is one of their many number-one singles on the Oricon chart.

Charts

Certifications

Into Free -Dangan- 

An English version, titled "Into Free -Dangan-", was released on April 4, 2012. It was the band's second digital single, after "Friction", and the first single released worldwide. The song was made for the game Dragon's Dogma, released for the PlayStation 3 and Xbox 360 in May 2012. According to the game's producer, Hiroyuki Kobayashi, B'z was chosen as he thought their popularity would help more people know about the game. The song was not used in the game's expanded version, Dragon's Dogma: Dark Arisen, released in 2013. The song later appeared on their self-titled EP, released on July 25, 2012, which featured English versions of their other songs.

The song debuted at number 16 on the Billboard Japan Hot 100.

Charts

References

External links
B'z official website

1998 singles
B'z songs
Oricon Weekly number-one singles
Songs written by Tak Matsumoto
Songs written by Koshi Inaba
1998 songs